Norman Forde (born 30 April 1977) is a Barbadian footballer. He started his career as an apprentice with Nottingham Forest, where his progress was inhibited by a succession of injuries. The midfielder has spent most of his career with Youth Milan in the Barbados Premier Division, returning there after one season with Notre Dame SC. Forde has won the League Championship three times - in 2006 and 2011 with Youth Milan and 2008 with Notre Dame SC, when he also was the league's top scorer with 13 goals in 20 matches. He plays for and captains the Barbados national team having started in both of their first round World Cup qualification matches in 2008 as well as captaining the national side in the second leg against Dominica.

International goals

References

External links

1977 births
Living people
Barbadian footballers
Barbados international footballers
Association football midfielders
Youth Milan FC players
notre Dame SC players